Percy Eckel CBE (born 1892, date of death unknown) was a British police officer and was the Inspector General of Police of the Gold Coast Police Service from 18 August 1948 to 25 May 1949.

References

1892 births
Year of death missing
Commanders of the Order of the British Empire
British people in the British Gold Coast
British colonial police officers